The Black Diamond (French: Le diamant noir) is a 1941 French drama film directed by Jean Delannoy and starring Charles Vanel, Louise Carletti and Gaby Morlay. It is a remake of the 1922 silent film of the same title.

The film's sets were designed by the art director Marcel Magniez.

Cast
 Charles Vanel as François Mitry 
 Louise Carletti as Nora Mitry 
 Gaby Morlay as Mademoiselle Marthe Dubard 
 Maurice Escande as Guy de Fresnoy 
 Carlettina as Nora à 9ans 
 Jean Joffre as Daniel
 Henriette Delannoy as Madame de Morigny 
 Jeanne Véniat as Cathy 
 Gabrielle Davran as Soeur Angèle 
 Paul Demange as Le chauffeur 
 Hélène Constant as Thérèse Mitry 
 Guy Denancy as Jacques Maurin 
 Michel Retaux as Jacques à 12ans 
 Jacques Roussel as Vincent 
 Georges Paulais as Un invité

References

Bibliography 
 Dayna Oscherwitz & MaryEllen Higgins. The A to Z of French Cinema. Scarecrow Press, 2009.

External links 
 

1941 films
French drama films
1941 drama films
1940s French-language films
Films directed by Jean Delannoy
French black-and-white films
1940s French films